Telamona is a genus of treehoppers in the family Membracidae. There are at least 30 described species in Telamona.

Species
These 38 species belong to the genus Telamona:

 Telamona agrandata Ball c g b
 Telamona ampelopsidis (Harris, 1841) c g b (Virginia creeper treehopper)
 Telamona ampliata b
 Telamona archboldi Froeschner, 1968 c g b (Archbold's treehopper)
 Telamona balli Plummer c g
 Telamona barbata Van Duzee c g
 Telamona calva Ball c g
 Telamona celsa Goding c g
 Telamona collina (Walker, 1851) c g b
 Telamona compacta Ball c g b
 Telamona concava Fitch, 1851 c g b
 Telamona coronata Ball c g
 Telamona decorata Ball c g b
 Telamona dorana Ball c g
 Telamona dubiosa Van Duzee c g b
 Telamona excelsa Fairmaire g b
 Telamona extrema Ball, 1903 c g b
 Telamona gemma b
 Telamona gibbera Ball c g
 Telamona lugubris Ball c g
 Telamona maculata Van Duzee, 1908 c g b
 Telamona molaris b
 Telamona monticola Fabricius c g b
 Telamona praealta b
 Telamona projecta Butler g b
 Telamona reclivata Fitch, 1851 c g b
 Telamona ruficarinata Fowler c g
 Telamona salvini Fowler, 1896 c g b
 Telamona scalaris b
 Telamona spreta Goding, 1893 c g b
 Telamona tarda Ball c g
 Telamona tigrina Ball b
 Telamona tiliae Ball, 1925 c g b (basswood treehopper)
 Telamona tristis Fitch, 1851 c g b
 Telamona unicolor Fitch c g
 Telamona vestita Ball c g b
 Telamona westcotti Goding, 1893 c g b
 Telamona woodruffi Ball c g

Data sources: i = ITIS, c = Catalogue of Life, g = GBIF, b = Bugguide.net

References

Further reading

External links

 

Smiliinae
Auchenorrhyncha genera